Events in the year 2013 in China.

Incumbents

Paramount leader
General Secretary of the Communist Party – Xi Jinping

Head of state
President – Hu Jintao (until March 14), Xi Jinping (starting March 14)
Vice President – Xi Jinping (until March 14), Li Yuanchao (starting March 14)

Head of government
Premier – Wen Jiabao (until March 15), Li Keqiang (starting March 15)
Vice Premier – Li Keqiang (until March 15), Zhang Gaoli (starting March 15)

National legislature
Congress chairman – Wu Bangguo (until March 14), Zhang Dejiang
(starting March 14)

Political advisory
Conference chairman – Jia Qinglin (until March 11), Yu Zhengsheng (starting March 11)

Governors 
 Governor of Anhui Province – Li Bin (until March), Wang Xuejun (starting March)
 Governor of Fujian Province – Su Shulin 
 Governor of Gansu Province – Liu Weiping 
 Governor of Guangdong Province – Zhu Xiaodan 
 Governor of Guizhou Province – Chen Min'er 
 Governor of Hainan Province – Jiang Dingzhi 
 Governor of Hebei Province – Zhang Qingwei
 Governor of Heilongjiang Province: – Wang Xiankui (until March), Lu Hao (starting March)
 Governor of Henan Province – Guo Gengmao (until March), Xie Fuzhan (starting March) 
 Governor of Hubei Province – Wang Guosheng 
 Governor of Hunan Province – Xu Shousheng (until 5 April), Du Jiahao (starting 5 April) 
 Governor of Jiangsu Province – Li Xueyong 
 Governor of Jiangxi Province – Lu Xinshe 
 Governor of Jilin Province – Bayanqolu 
 Governor of Liaoning Province – Chen Zhenggao 
 Governor of Qinghai Province – Luo Huining (until March), Hao Peng (starting March)
 Governor of Shaanxi Province – Lou Qinjian 
 Governor of Shandong Province – Jiang Daming (until March), Guo Shuqing (starting March)
 Governor of Shanxi Province – Li Xiaopeng 
 Governor of Sichuan Province – Jiang Jufeng (until January), Wei Hong (starting January)
 Governor of Yunnan Province – Li Jiheng 
 Governor of Zhejiang Province – Li Qiang

Events

January 
January 3 - 2013 Southern Weekly incident

April 
April 15 - 2013 Daulat Beg Oldi Incident
April 20 - 2013 Lushan earthquake
April 24 - April 2013 Bachu unrest

May 
May 24 - Ding Jinhao engraving scandal

June 
June 7 - Xiamen bus fire
June 16–21 - 5th Straits Forum
June 22 - 2013 Shanghai shooting
June 26 - June 2013 Shanshan riots

July 
Early July - 2013 Southwest China floods
July 19 – The court case for the Mutiny on Lurongyu 2682 was decided. The 11 sailors returned were convicted with murder, leading to the deaths of 22 in the South Pacific.
July 20 - 2013 Beijing Capital International Airport bombing

October 
October 21 - 2013 Harbin smog starts to spread.

Deaths
January 28 - Xu Liangying, physicist, translator, historian and philosopher (b. 1920)
June 2 - Chen Xitong, politician, former member of the Political Bureau (b. 1930)
June 4 - Luo Meizhen, supercentenarian (b. 1885)

See also
 List of Chinese films of 2013

References

 
Years of the 21st century in China